Srikishan Sarda College, also known as S.S. College, established in 1950, is a general degree college situated in Hailakandi, Assam. The college is affiliated with the Assam University.

References

External links
http://www.sscollegehkd.ac.in/

Universities and colleges in Assam
Colleges affiliated to Assam University
Educational institutions established in 1950
1950 establishments in Assam